The Jacob and Simon uprising was a revolt instigated in Roman Judea by brothers Simon and Jacob in 46–48 CE. The revolt, which was concentrated in the Galilee, began as a sporadic insurgency and when climaxed in 48 CE was quickly put down by Roman authorities and both brothers executed.

Background

The Crisis under Caligula (37–41) has been proposed as the "first open break between Rome and the Jews", even though problems were already evident during the Census of Quirinius in 6 and under Sejanus (before 31).

Josephus' Jewish Antiquities states that there were three main Jewish sects at this time, the Pharisees, the Sadducees, and the Essenes. The Zealots were a "fourth sect", founded by Judas of Galilee (also called Judas of Gamala) in the year 6 against Quirinius' tax reform, shortly after the Roman Empire declared what had most recently been the tetrarchy of Herod Archelaus to be a Roman province, and that they "agree in all other things with the Pharisaic notions; but they have an inviolable attachment to liberty, and say that God is to be their only Ruler and Lord." (18.1.6)

According to the Jewish Encyclopedia article on Zealots:

Others have also argued that the group was not so clearly marked out (before the first war of 66-70/3) as some have thought.

Revolt of 48 CE

The information on the revolt which erupted in Galilee, then part of the Roman Judea province, is limited. The sources however indicate that the revolt was motivated by anti-Roman sentiments and driven by Zealots. The revolt, which was concentrated in the Galilee, began as sporadic insurgency and then climaxed in 48 CE.

Two of Judas the Galilean' sons, Jacob and Simon, were involved in a revolt and were executed by Tiberius Alexander, the procurator of Iudaea province from 46 to 48.

Aftermath

18 years after the events of the revolt in Galilee the entire province of Judea revolted against Rome, in what became known as the Great Revolt of Judea.

See also 
Second Temple
List of conflicts in the Near East

References

46
47
48
40s in the Roman Empire
1st-century Judaism
1st-century rebellions
Galilee
Jewish–Roman wars
Judea (Roman province)
Rebellions in Asia
Rebellions against the Roman Empire
Religion-based wars
40s conflicts